Lipariscus nanus, the pygmy snailfish, is a species of snailfish native to the northern Pacific Ocean where it occurs in deep waters down to . The range is broad, extending from the Sea of Okhotsk (off Hokkaido) north to the western Bering Sea, and from Monterey Bay, California, north to the Gulf of Alaska.  This species grows to a length of  SL in males and to  SL in females.  It is the only known member of its genus.

References

Liparidae
Monotypic fish genera
Fish described in 1915